The 2022 northeastern Ukraine–Russia border skirmishes are a series of border skirmishes along the Russia-Ukraine border during the 2022 Russian invasion of Ukraine. They started on 6 April 2022 when the Ukrainian Army attacked Kursk Oblast with mortars and multiple rockets.  Ukrainian officials say that strikes across the border happen every day. After the liberation of most of the Kharkiv region as a result of the 2022 Kharkiv counteroffensive, from September the section of the Russian-Ukrainian border between the Belgorod and Kharkiv regions also became the front.

Background 
By 4 April, Russian forces had left and withdrew from the Sumy Oblast as part of the wider failure of the Russian offensive towards Kyiv, but shelling still continued across the border.

Incidents

April 2022 

The governor of the Kursk Oblast announced that a border post in the Sudzhansky District had been bombed, reportedly by Ukrainian forces, on 6 April.

According to Ukrainian officials, Russian forces shelled on the Russia-Ukraine border, severely damaging 2 villages.

May 2022 

Russian forces started shelling across the Shostka district with rocket launchers on 8 May.  Russian forces also destroyed a Jewish cemetery.

On 12 May, a civilian was killed due to the shelling. On 13 May, Russia fired on a border village in the Shostka district using unguided air missiles.

As shelling continued, Russian forces defeated a few elements of the Ukrainian Border Guard and entered Shostka district on 16 May.  Fighting continued until 17 May, when they were finally kicked out.

On 21 May, 6 Russian air strikes and artillery hit the border settlement of Kucherivka.

Russian war planes hit two villages in Shostka on 24 May.

On 28 May, Russian warplanes targeted the Ukrainian border and started firing the border with mortars from the Russian village of Troebortnoe.

Russian forces used flechettes on border villages in the Shostka district on 30 May.  The flechettes were used to previously kill civilians in Bucha during the Battle of Bucha earlier in the war.  Russian forces shelled a village all night.  According to Kyiv Independent, Russian forces shelled at the border more than 20 times from the Russian village of Zyornovo.

June 2022 

On 4 June, Russian aircraft destroyed a locality on the border from 6 missiles being deployed in Mykolayivka.  Three hours later explosions blew up across Velyka Pysarivka Raion in Sumy Oblast.  Shelling was also reported in Novhorod-Siversky Raion in Chernihiv Oblast.

On 8 June, Russian forces destroyed a building of the Ukrainian Border Control from the Russian border checkpoint of Troebortnoe.

Russian forces fired 7 times on 10 June.  The mortars and artillery were fired from Zyornovo and Strachevo in Bryansk Oblast.  Around four villages were destroyed in Sumy and Chernihiv Oblasts.

Russian forces on 19 June, fired mortars on the city of Seredyna-Buda in Sumy Oblast.  A huge fire was caused and residents had to evacuate the city.

Russian forces fired missiles from Belarus into the town of Desna in Chernihiv Oblast on 25 June. 
Around 20 were shot 

One person was killed and one injured as Russian troops fired on Yunakivka, Bilopillia, Krasnopillia and Shalyhyne on 26 June in Sumy Oblast.  Around 150 projectiles were launched with Krasnopillia suffering the most, as Zhyvytskyi said "it was destroyed."

On June 27, Governor Dmytro Zhyvytskyi stated that Russians attacked the hromadas of Krasnopillia and Bilopillia, leaving one person injured.

Shots were heard in Krasnopilla, Velyka Pysarivka, and Khotin on 30 June.  Around 70 shots were fired on Krasnopilla, 10 missile strikes on Velyka Pysarivka, and 120mm mortars on Khotin.  Mortar strikes were also reported in Semenivka.

July 2022 

Russian forces fired with artillery and mortars on Sumy Oblast 3 times on 3 July.  Russian forces fired at Shalyhyne in Shostka Raion with 12 strikes recorded.  Russian troops then fired on Esman. Later that day, 14 mortar projectiles were launched again on Shalyhyne.

On 4 July, a Russian helicopter fired at a Esman school.

On 5 July, Russian troops launched a missile strike on the city of Shostka in which private enterprises were destroyed and around 24 residential buildings were damaged.  Russian forces also fired on Semenivka in Chernihiv Oblast.

Russian forces fired on Shalyhyne, Bilopillia, Znob-Novhorodske and Krasnopillia on 12 July with Krasnopillia getting hit twice with rocket launchers.

On 13 July, shelled four villages in Sumy Oblast.

On 16 July, Russian forces destroyed a farm and a school in Esman.

On 17 July, Russian troops shelled Velyka Pysarivka, Krasnopillia, Khotin, Bilopillia, Shalyhyne, Nova Sloboda, Esman, and Seredyna-Buda in Sumy Oblast as well as Snovsk in Chernihiv Oblast.

Explosions were reported on Hlukhiv on 18 July.  Shalyhyne also suffered attacks as well as Khotin.  Mykolayivka suffered attacks from MRLS.

On 24 July, Russian forces fired at the Sumy Oblast 12 times, primarily the villages of Shalyhyne, Mykolaivka, Bilopillia, Khotin, Yunakivka, and Krasnopillia.  One person was reportedly killed and 2 military aircraft fired on Mykolaiv. Later that day, Ukrainian officials admitted that Sumy and Chernihiv Oblasts were fired on every day.

Explosions were heard across the border with Sumy Oblast where 55 were reported on 26 July.  One woman was injured.  The villages targeted were Esman, Krasnopil, and Seredino-Budsk.  Explosions were also heard in Chernihiv Oblast  Over 20 explosions were reported.

Russian forces shelled Sumy Oblast 44 times on 28 July.  The same day Russian forces on Belarusian territory launched missiles on Honcharivska in Chernihiv Oblast.

Russian troops heavily shelled Semenivka in Chernihiv Oblast on 29 July.  The city's administrative building was heavily damaged.

References 

Battles of the 2022 Russian invasion of Ukraine
April 2022 events in Ukraine
May 2022 events in Ukraine
History of Sumy Oblast
Northeastern Ukraine campaign